Touboro is a town and commune in North Region Cameroon.

Refugees
An April 10, 2014 report says:
"Thousands of refugees, fleeing the violence of armed groups (Séléka and Anti-balaka) are concentrated in the towns of Mbaimboum and Touboro, on the border between the two Countries. Neither the local authorities nor international organizations are providing care for these people, who are left on their own or, in the best cases, can count on the solidarity of relatives and friends from Cameroon."

See also
Communes of Cameroon

References

 Site de la primature - Élections municipales 2002 
 Contrôle de gestion et performance des services publics communaux des villes camerounaises - Thèse de Donation Avele, Université Montesquieu Bordeaux IV 
 Charles Nanga, La réforme de l’administration territoriale au Cameroun à la lumière de la loi constitutionnelle n° 96/06 du 18 janvier 1996, Mémoire ENA. 

Populated places in North Region (Cameroon)
Communes of Cameroon
Cameroon–Central African Republic border crossings